Mohammed Loulichki (born 1952 in Fes) is a Moroccan diplomat. He was Morocco's Permanent Representative to the United Nations in New York between November 2008 and 14 April 2014.

Loulichki has also been the Permanent Representative of Morocco to the United Nations in Geneva and the Moroccan ambassador to Bosnia and Herzegovina, Croatia, and Hungary.

In December 2012, Loulichki was the President of the United Nations Security Council.

References

1952 births
Ambassadors of Morocco to Bosnia and Herzegovina
Ambassadors of Morocco to Croatia
Ambassadors of Morocco to Hungary
Moroccan diplomats
People from Fez, Morocco
Permanent Representatives of Morocco to the United Nations
Living people
Mohammed V University alumni